Antonio Cupo (born January 10, 1978) is a Canadian film and television actor.

Early life
Born in Vancouver on January 10, 1978, into a family of Italian immigrants who arrived in Canada in 1968, Antonio Cupo is the youngest of three children. His father Manlio is from Palomonte, a small town in the province of Salerno, 70 miles southeast of Naples and 30 east of Salerno and his mother Lucia from Barletta, in the recent Province of Barletta-Andria-Trani. His siblings are Sabato and Carmelina. He graduated in English Literature at the University of British Columbia.

Career
From the age of six to sixteen he performed in many theatrical production both scholastically and regionally. He was also the lead singer of the band Hybrid Cartel.

His first starring role was under the direction of Fabio Segatori in the film Hollywood Files.

In Italy he is known for his role as the male lead in the second season of Elisa di Rivombrosa. He also starred in the films, directed by Renzo Martinelli, Carnera - The Walking Mountain, Barbarossa, and September Eleven 1683.

Cupo has starred in Hallmark Channel original movies such as Love at the Thanksgiving Day Parade, Hats Off to Christmas!, For Better or for Worse, and In My Dreams.

In 2017, Cupo played the character of John in the  Lifetime remake Beaches with actresses Idina Menzel and Nia Long. On April 16, 2022, he starred in the Lifetime thriller film, Wrath: A Seven Deadly Sins Story.

Filmography

Film

Television

References

External links

1978 births
Living people
Canadian male film actors
Canadian people of Italian descent
Male actors from Vancouver
People of Apulian descent